Alen MacWeeney (born 1939) is an American photographer. MacWeeny is known his photographs of itinerant Irish Travellers, made during a six-year period beginning in 1965.

He is the author of the photo book  Irish Travellers: Tinkers No More. His work is included in the collections of the Museum of Fine Arts Houston, the Museum of Modern Art, New York and the Art Institute of Chicago.

References

Living people
1939 births
20th-century American photographers
21st-century American photographers
20th-century American artists
21st-century American artists